Charles Bowen Howry (May 14, 1844 – July 20, 1928) was a Mississippi attorney and politician. He was a veteran of the Confederate States Army, a member of the Mississippi House of Representatives, United States Attorney for the Northern District of Mississippi and a judge of the Court of Claims.

Early life and military service

Howry was born on May 14, 1844, in Oxford, Mississippi, the son of James M. Howry and Narcissa (Bowen) Howry. He received his early education in Oxford and began studies at the University of Mississippi, but left college to serve in the American Civil War. Howry joined the Confederate States Army's 29th Mississippi Infantry Regiment as a private. He later received a commission, and attained the rank of captain. Howry's combat experience included the Battles of Chickamauga, Lookout Mountain, Missionary Ridge, Resaca, New Hope Church, Peachtree Creek, Atlanta, Jonesborough, and Franklin. Howry was wounded at the Battle of Franklin, and remained in the military until the end of the war. After the war, Howry was a longtime member of the United Confederate Veterans. He served in several leadership roles, including commander of the Army of Northern Virginia department with the rank of lieutenant general.

Education and career

After the war, Howry studied law with Lucius Quintus Cincinnatus Lamar II, and then returned to the University of Mississippi School of Law, from which he received a Bachelor of Laws degree in 1867. Howry was admitted to the bar later that year, and entered private practice in Oxford. He was a trustee of the university from 1882 to 1894, and in 1896 the university awarded him the honorary degree of LL.D. In addition to practicing in Oxford, Howry was active in politics as a Democrat, and was elected to a term as prosecuting attorney of Lafayette County, Mississippi in 1869. He was a member of the Mississippi House of Representatives from 1880 to 1884. From 1885 to 1889, Howry was the United States Attorney for the Northern District of Mississippi. Howry was a longtime member of the Mississippi Democratic Party's executive committee, and he was a member of the Democratic National Committee from 1891 to 1896. From 1891 to 1892, Howry was a vice president of the American Bar Association. He was a United States Assistant Attorney General for the United States Department of Justice in Washington, D.C., from 1893 to 1897.

Federal judicial service

Howry received a recess appointment from President Grover Cleveland on November 23, 1896, to a Judge seat on the Court of Claims (later the United States Court of Claims) vacated by Judge Charles C. Nott. He was nominated to the same position by President Cleveland on December 8, 1896. He was confirmed by the United States Senate on January 28, 1897, and received his commission the same day. His service terminated on March 6, 1915, due to his resignation. He was succeeded by Judge George Eddy Downey.

Judicial philosophy and notable opinions

While on the court, Howry became known for his ability to apply the historical precedents of Anglo-American common law to his decisions and written opinions. His notable opinions included the decisions in the French Spoliation Claims, Ayres v. United States and Lincoln v. United States.

Declined consideration for promotion

President Woodrow Wilson offered to appoint Howry as Chief Justice, which he declined because of Wilson's condition that if he accepted, Howry would retire on reaching age 70 in 1914.

Later career

Following his resignation from the federal bench, Howry resumed private practice in Washington, D.C. Additionally, he was Chairman of the federal railroad Board of Arbitration in 1916, and special counsel to the United States Department of Labor from 1918 to 1919.

Death and burial

Howry died in Washington, D.C. of heart failure on July 20, 1928. He was buried at Oxford Memorial Cemetery.

Family

In 1869, Howry married Edmonia Beverley Carter of Virginia. She died in 1879, and they were the parents of two sons, Lucien Beverley Howry and Willard Carter Lowry, and a daughter, Maude. Howry remarried in 1880, becoming the husband of Harriet (Hallie) Holt of Columbus, Mississippi. They had four children—Charles Jr., Hallie, Elizabeth, and Mary. The second Mrs. Howry died in 1898. In 1900, Howry married Sallie Bird Smith (d. 1942), the widow of Buckingham Smith.

References

Sources

Magazines

Books

Newspapers

Further reading

External links
 Charles Bowen Howry at the Federal Judicial Center

1844 births
1928 deaths
Members of the Mississippi House of Representatives
Judges of the United States Court of Claims
United States Article I federal judges appointed by Grover Cleveland
19th-century American judges